Lost Angel is the sole studio album by Californian nu metal group 3rd Strike. It was released on May 14, 2002 through Hollywood Records. The album features two singles, "No Light" and "Redemption." The radio single and video of the former garnered significant airplay upon release. Lost Angel also includes a cover of Black Sabbath's "Paranoid", with an additional rapped verse.

Track listing
All songs were written by Jim Korthe, Todd Deguchi, Erik Carlsson, Gabe Hammersmith and PJ McMullan except "Paranoid" (written by John Michael Osbourne, Anthony Frank Iommi, Terence Michael   Joseph Butler and William Thomas Ward).

"Flow Heat"
"Walked Away"
"Redemption"
"Blind My Eyes"
"No Light"
"City's On Fire"
"Breathe It Out"
"All Lies"
"Strung Out"
"Lisa"
"Paranoid"
"Hang On"

Bonus tracks
"Sick Skin"
"Champagne Dreams" (demo version)
"Strung Out" (demo version)

Personnel
Jim Korthe – lead vocals
Todd Deguchi – guitars
Erik Carlsson – guitars
Gabe Hammersmith – bass
PJ McMullan – drums

Charts

Singles

External links 

2002 debut albums
3rd Strike albums
Albums produced by Toby Wright